Anthony Scott Grady (born August 6, 1990) is an American football defensive end who is currently a free agent. He played college football at Missouri State. He was signed by the New York Jets as an undrafted free agent in 2014.

Early years
Grady attended Arkansas High School in Texarkana, Arkansas where he won back-to-back Class 6A state championships in the 2006 and 2007 seasons. He participated in the Arkansas All-Star Game. He had 58 tackles, 9 sacks and 14 pass deflections in his senior season in high school.

College career
In 2009, he was selected as the MSU Defensive Scout Team Co-Player of the Year following the season. He was named MSU Defensive Scout Team Player of the Week. In his junior season, he was named as an All-MVFC honorable mention. Also in his junior season, he was named CFPA National Defensive Lineman of the Week. He finished college with a total of 108 Tackles, 9 Sacks and 6 Pass Deflections.

Professional career

New York Jets
On May 11, 2014, he signed with the New York Jets as an undrafted free agent. He was released on August 24, 2014.

New Orleans VooDoo
On November 17, 2014, he was assigned to the New Orleans VooDoo of the Arena Football League. He was placed on league suspension on April 2, 2015.

References

External links
Missouri State bio

1990 births
Living people
American football defensive ends
Missouri State Bears football players
New York Jets players
New Orleans VooDoo players